The Chapel of Kambál na Krus ("Twin Crosses"; Filipino: Kapilya ng Kambál na Krus) is a visita along Raxabago St, Tondo, Manila, Philippines. The chapel is under the jurisdiction of St. Joseph de Gagalangin Parish, and covers six barangays. Its Feast Day is celebrated every third Sunday of March.

History
On March 23, 1922, a young labourer named Crispino Lacandaso was chopping wood from a felled, hundred year-old sampalok (Tamarindus indica) tree on an empty lot at 1885 Juan Luna Street, Gagalangin, Manila,

Lacandaso initially had difficulty cutting the trunk, but upon finally cleaving in twain, he saw a dark cross on a base, imprinted on both halves of the wood. The pieces of wood were subsequently encased in glass, and devotees from other parts of the city flocked to the site, and a small chapel was later built to enshrine the wood.

Renovations
The 2009 renovation completely altered the chapel, adding a second altar and two more floors to the structure. On the second floor is the new choir loft, while a rooftop area and bellcote are on the third. The altar was also overhauled, and the chapel received a new set of liturgical vessels.

In 2013, the façade of the first storey was redesigned to appear as though it was built in the 19th Century. The two crosses outside changed into a wooden cross, while the wall was changed into adobe.

Devotion
During the fiesta, many people go to the chapel to venerate the crosses, showing gratitude for the past year's blessings. On Maundy Thursday, many people from provinces and other cities in Metro Manila select the chapel as a station as they perform the traditional Visita Iglesia pilgrimage.

Feast Day
The chapel's Discovery Day is on 23 March, but the actual celebration is held on the third Sunday of March. A triduum of Masses precedes the day of the fiesta. On the feast day itself, two Masses are celebrated: one in the morning and one in the afternoon, followed by a procession. The fiesta commemorates the alleged miraculous properties of the chapel's twin crosses.

Gallery

 Coordinates:  14°37'13"N  120°58'16"E.

References

Roman Catholic churches in Manila
Buildings and structures in Tondo, Manila